The Gran Chaco is a plain of about 1.000.000 km2. It covers parts of Bolivia, Paraguay, Brazil and Argentina.

It is a region with its own characteristics, which has very particular types of animals and plants. The Great South American Chaco is a plain and its formation, millions of years ago, is very closely related to the formation of the Andes and the erosive process afterwards. Originally the Chaco was a basin, which within time, was filled with sediments of aerial origin (through wind action) and of pluvial origin (through rivers taking and depositing sediments in the Chaco).

Environmental impacts on the Paraguayan Chaco
exploitation of red quebracho trees (Schinopsis balansae and Schinopsis lorentzii) for the tannin industry (19th and 20th centuries)
Settlement of the Mennonite colonies, from the 1920s, in the Central Chaco
The Chaco War (Paraguay-Bolivia) (1932–1935)
Oil prospecting
Construction and pavement of roads, especially the Carlos Antonio López or Trans-Chaco highway (Route 9), Route 5 between Pozo Colorado and Concepción, and the Bioceanic Corridor.
Construction of bridges over the Paraguay River: puentes sobre, Puente Remanso (Asunción-Villa Hayes), and the Nanawa bridge (Concepción-Puerto Militar)
Experimental agro stations

Protected Areas: national parks and natural reservations

Cerro Cabrera – Timané Natural Reservation

Created in 1998, today has an area of 125.823 ha. The River Timané is located in the zone and it`is considered a special river because it does not end up in any water course or lagoon. The Cerro Cabrera is in the border with Bolivia. The vegetation there is mainly a dense savanna and open forests. There are a lot of white quebracho, samuù and palo santo trees. Animals include wild felines, armadillos, giant anteater, and tapir.

Chovoreca Natural Monument

Choroveca National Monument was created in 1998 with an area of 100.953 ha. Its vegetation is different from the rest of the Chaco and it can be said to be unique in the country.
It has a reddish sand soil, which is characteristic of the Oriental Region, and very shallow. Its beauty is unique and difficult to value, for its bushes as well as for the high forest where you can find the endangered trebol (Amburana cearensis). Animals include yurumí u oso hormiguero, el Kaguaré, and other species of felines and  armadillos.

Defensores del Chaco National Park
Defensores del Chaco National Park is the largest protected area in Paraguay. It has an area of 720.000 ha. It was created with the decree number 16.806 on August 6, 1975.

The park covers a vast plain, and the vegetation includes white quebracho, palo santo, samuù, low forests, thorn bushes, and various species of cactus. It is an excellent area for large mammals such as the cats jaguar, puma, tirika (Geoffroy's cat), and jaguarundi, various species of armadillos, Ka’i mirikina (monkey), ka’i pyhare (Azara's night monkey), tagua (Chacoan peccary), and mboreví (South American tapir).

The park includes Cerro León, a unique geological formation in the Chaco. It covers around 40 km of diameter and it is made of a succession of hills.

The way to get there is through a 177 km road from Mcal Estigarribia to Gral P Colman, and from there a road to Lagerenza (north) and to Cerro Leon and Madrejon

Médanos del Chaco National Park

Médanos del Chaco National Park has an area of 514,233 ha. It was originally included in the Paraguayan Wildlands Project (Global Environment Facility of the UN). Of special interest in this national park are the "médanos" or dunes with their unique vegetation and guanacos. Park rangers have their base of operations in the nearby Teniente Agripino Enciso National Park.

Río Negro National Park

Created in 1998 with an original area of 30,000 ha, was enlarged in 2004 to 123,789 ha. It protects typical ecosystems of the Pantanal and Humid Chaco. There are a lot of areas that are regularly flooded and Karanda`y palm trees. It was declared Ramsar Site in 1995 by the Convention on Wetlands of International Importance, because it was considered a habitat of migratory birds as well as other wetland species, both animal and plant. Animals include jaguar, wild parrots, deer from the Pantanal, lobope and yacares. It does not have a plan yet, nor a tourism structure. The way to get there is through the Lagerenza-Bahia Negra road, or through Defensores del Chaco National Park.

Teniente Agripino Enciso National Park

Teniente Agripino Enciso National Park was created in 1980 with 40.000 ha. Its size and shape is practically rectangular, and it makes it easier to protect from the biological diversity. It has typical landscapes of the Dry Chaco. Due to the lack of water, its vegetation is characterized by dense and almost impenetrable thorn forest. Its typical trees are white quebracho, palo santo, and samu’u.
There is a great quantity of wild mammals such as felines (yaguarte and others), the three peccaries (the tagua is the symbol of the area). The park also has trenches and ways from the Chaco War, which can be visited with the park guards who are specially trained to attend tourists.

Tinfunqué National Park

It was created in 1996 as national park of 280.00ha. Today it is recommended a change of category to  reservation of handle resources, because all of its territory is in private hands  and the category of national park only can be used in wild areas which are protected  and are public. The Tinfunque was declared Site Ramsar and therefore is on the list of the Wet areas of international importance. It occupies a sector which remains flooded in times of high waters of the Pilcomayo River and it has large natural plantation of grass.

There are many shrubs adapted to the floods, and animals such as the ñandy, wild ducks, storks, chaja, aguara guazu, giant anteater, carpincho, and yacares. Its conservation depends only on the wildlife and cattle, and they can be together in the same space. It is very common to see the ñandy and the carpinchos sharing the water with cattle.
The way to get there is through the Transchaco road, 180 km, then Pozo Colorado, a detour to the west, to Fortín General Diaz.

References 

 Dirección de Áreas Silvestres Protegidas DAP/SEAM.
 Proyecto Paraguay Silvestre / PAR/98/G33/SEAM.
 Gobernación Departamento Central.

External links 
 Birding Site Guide provides birders with free, where to watch birds information worldwide
 Parques Nacionales

Gran Chaco
National parks of Paraguay
Protected areas established in 1975
Protected areas established in 1988
Protected areas established in 1996
1975 establishments in South America
1988 establishments in Paraguay
1996 establishments in South America